Wonfurt is a municipality in the district of Haßberge in Bavaria in Germany.

Mayors

Since 2013 Holger Baunacher (CSU/Dampfacher Liste/Steinsfelder Liste) is the mayor of Wonfurt. His predecessor was Dieter Zehendner (CSU).

References

Haßberge (district)